Tagansky District is a district of Central Administrative Okrug of the federal city of Moscow, Russia, located between the Moskva and Yauza Rivers near the mouth of the latter. Population:   

The district takes its name from the former Taganskaya sloboda, where the copper-smiths lived in the 16th century. Tagan is the old Russian word for their product, a trivet to set a pot on (known in English as "brand-iron"). 

The modern center of the Taganka district is the Taganskaya Square, where the Taganka Theatre is located. The skyline is dominated by the Kotelnicheskaya Embankment Building, once the tallest skyscraper in the Soviet Union. The area contains a fine set of pre-Petrine parish churches, including the Athonite metochion and the Bolvanovka church.

Major sights include the 18th-century Foundling Home and at least three walled monasteries — the Andronikov, the Pokrovsky, and the Novospassky.

References

External links
Taganka - Prison, Area, Today

Central Administrative Okrug
Districts of Moscow